The Batumi Synagogue (batumis sinagoga) is a synagogue in Batumi, Adjara, Georgia. It was built by Semyon Vulkovich in 1904.

References

Synagogues in Georgia (country)
Buildings and structures in Batumi
Synagogues completed in 1904
1904 establishments in Asia
Moorish Revival synagogues